Nahr-e Masjed (also known as Masjed) is a village in Nasar Rural District, Arvandkenar District, Abadan County, Khuzestan Province, Iran. At the 2006 census, its population was 14, in 4 families.

References 

Populated places in Abadan County